Briançonnais may refer to:

the people of Briançon
, a natural region of France
Briançonnais zone, a piece of continental crust

See also
Republic of the Escartons, sometimes called the Briançonnais